"Dear Mr. Fantasy" is a rock song by Traffic from their 1967 album, Mr. Fantasy.  Jim Capaldi contributed the lyrics, while Steve Winwood and Chris Wood composed the music.

In a song review for AllMusic, Lindsay Planer writes: 

Dave Matthews mentioned this song specifically as part of his speech inducting Traffic into the Rock and Roll Hall of Fame, and this is the song performed by the surviving members of Traffic as part of that same induction.

Renditions
Traffic recorded an extended version (10:57) for their live album Welcome to the Canteen (1971).  Winwood played the song at Eric Clapton's 2007 Crossroads Guitar Festival and the song appears on the festival DVD.  Winwood and Clapton played the song on their joint tour; a live recording appears on the album Live from Madison Square Garden (2009). Planer also notes performances by Mike Bloomfield and Al Kooper (1969, The Live Adventures of Mike Bloomfield and Al Kooper); the Grateful Dead (1980s–1990s), and Crosby, Stills, & Nash (1991, CSN box set).

References

1967 songs
Traffic (band) songs
Grateful Dead songs
Song recordings produced by Jimmy Miller
Songs written by Jim Capaldi
Songs written by Steve Winwood